The Ninth Kerala Legislative Assembly Council of Ministers in A. K. Antony's second ministry, was a Kerala Council of Ministers (Kerala Cabinet), the executive wing of Kerala state government, led by Indian National Congress Party leader A. K. Antony from 22 March 1995 to 9 May 1996. Antony became the 16th Chief Minister of Kerala, following the resignation of K. Karunakaran, and his newly appointed ministry had 18 ministries.

The Kerala Council of Ministers, during Antony's second term as Chief Minister of Kerala, consisted of:

Ministers

See also 
 A. K. Antony ministry term 1 and A. K. Antony ministry term 3
 Chief Ministers of Kerala
 All Kerala Ministers

Notes

Antony 02
Indian National Congress state ministries
Indian National Congress of Kerala
1995 establishments in Kerala
1996 disestablishments in India
Cabinets established in 1995
Cabinets disestablished in 1996